Austin Presbyterian Theological Seminary is a Presbyterian seminary in Austin, Texas. It was founded in 1902 to provide pastors for the rapidly growing Presbyterian Church in the frontier Southwest. Thonton Rogers Sampson was the first president. It opened its doors to five students on October 1, 1902, at Ninth and Navasota Streets. The Seminary moved to its present location adjacent to The University of Texas campus in 1908. Since its inception, Austin Seminary has educated almost 3000 persons for Christian leadership who have served in a variety of ministry settings in nearly every state and in many foreign countries.

Academics
The seminary offers five degrees:
 Master of Divinity including the dual degree MDiv/MSSW offered in partnership with the University of Texas at Austin Steve Hicks School of Social Work
 Master of Arts (Theological Studies) 
Master of Arts in Ministry Practice
Master of Arts in Youth Ministry, offered in partnership with the Center for Youth Ministry Training
 Doctor of Ministry

The seminary also offers non-degree programs, including two English-language certificates, the Certificate in Ministry and the Certificate in Jewish-Christian Relationship, and two Spanish-centric certificates, Certificado en Ministerio en Español and the bilingual Certificate in Christian Leadership for Hispanic Women. Education Beyond the Walls at Austin Seminary (EBW) offers workshops, webinars, and other opportunities for church leaders and the public. EBW also supports clergy through The College of Pastoral Leaders and Fellowships in Pastoral Leadership for Public Life programs. It resources ministry among hispanic congregations through the Hispanic Ministries Mission Network, Instituto de Mujer Virtuosa Hispana, and Latinx Church Leadership Renewal Grants for congregational revitalization.

Accreditation and memberships 
Austin Presbyterian Theological Seminary is accredited the Association of Theological Schools in the United States and Canada and the Southern Association of Colleges and Schools. It is a member of the Council of Southwestern Theological Schools, American Schools of Oriental Research, and the Association for Clinical Pastoral Education.

The seminary is related to the Synod of the Sun and to the General Assembly of the Presbyterian Church (U.S.A.). It is one of the nine official PC(USA) seminaries. The seminary is approved by The University Senate of The United Methodist Church and attracts students from many Protestant denominations.

Campus 

The campus comprises 12 acres in the center of Austin, Texas. Its main buildings include the McCord Community Center, McMillan Memorial Classroom Building, Trull Administration Building, the Mary B. and Robert J. Wright Learning and Information Center, Shelton Chapel, and student residential buildings, including duplexes, Currie Hall (a co-ed dormitory), McCoy House, and the John F. and Nancy Anderson House apartments.

Library and archives 

The Stitt Collection contains approximately 96,000 print volumes and 399,000 ebooks. The Austin Seminary Archives collects, preserves, and provides access to material documenting the history of the seminary, as well as the work of the Presbyterian Church in Texas, Louisiana, Arkansas, and Oklahoma. The Archives provides physical and intellectual access to the collections. One notable collection in the archives is The Apollo Prayer League collection, which contains a mounted Microform KJV Bible that was part of a set that traveled in the spacesuit of astronaut Edgar D. Mitchell during the 1971 Apollo XIV mission to the moon.

See also
 Presbyterian Church in the United States

References

External links 
Official website

Presbyterian Church (USA) seminaries
Presbyterian Theological Seminary
Seminaries and theological colleges in Texas
Universities and colleges accredited by the Southern Association of Colleges and Schools
Educational institutions established in 1902
Presbyterianism in Texas
1902 establishments in Texas